Louise Larocque Serpa (1925–2012) was an American Photographer specializing in rodeo photography. Born in New York City, Serpa became one of the first women allowed into the rodeo area to photograph, which led to a 48 year long career until her death in 2012.

Early life and education 
Louise Larocque Serpa was born in New York City on December 15, 1925.  She first encountered the west as a child, when her mother took her to Nevada in order to get divorced from her father. Serpa attended Miss Chapin’s School, which she regarded as being “For small girl snobs" and then Garrison Forest School for high school. After graduating in 1943 Serpa took a summer job as a ranch hand in Wyoming, where she met Lex Connelly, one of the founders of the modern rodeo. She returned to the east coast for college, where she obtaining a degree in music from Vassar College.

Career 
After graduating from Vassar, Serpa sang and danced along the East Coast in support of wartime USO programs. Feeling that this “proper” life was not for her she moved to Scottsdale. Louise Laroque Serpa’s interest in photography began at a Junior Rodeo Competition where she took pictures of the children and sold them to their parents.  Included in her portfolio were a number of western landscapes as well as portraits. In 1963, Serpa was the first woman allowed to be in the rodeo arena to photograph the action shots on film. On one occasion Serpa was launched 8 feet into the air by a bull, who additionally rammed her into the ground after she made her way back down to earth, breaking her sternum and some ribs. Serpa remained at the rodeo a little while longer before heading to the hospital and returned to the rodeo next day. She was the first woman allowed on the courses of the Grand National in England and the first to cover the Dublin Horse Show. Serpa expanded her expertise to photographing cutting shows, polo matches. She was also the first woman allowed on the courses of the prestigious Grand National in England and the first to cover the Dublin Horse Show.

Personal life 
Serpa married twice. Her first marriage was on the east coast, to a man from Yale. The two divorced due to infidelity on her part, after which she traveled to the American west, where she met and married Gordon "Tex" Serpa. The two inherited a family a sheep ranch in Ashland, Oregon, where they raised their daughters, Lauren and Mia Serpa. After Serpa discovered that her husband was unfaithful, she took the children and headed for Tucson, Arizona.

Achievements 
Serpa was inducted into the Arizona Women's Hall of Fame as well as the National Cowgirl Hall of Fame.  She was granted a Rodeo Cowboys Association Press Card, and was the first woman allowed to photograph within the fenced arena grounds at many events, such as the Grand National Horse Race, Dublin Horse Show, and Sydney Royal Easter Show.  She was also awarded the Tad Lucas Award from the National Cowboy & Western Heritage Museum. The Pima County Sports Hall of Fame honored her in 2005. In 2006, Louise was chosen grand marshal of the Tucson Rodeo Parade. She rode horseback in the parade. In 2005 she received the PRCA Excellence in Photography Award. Her works are published in Rodeo by Aperture.

Later life 
Serpa was diagnosed with cancer in 2008, but despite the diagnosis she continued to photograph. She could no longer enter the ring, instead photographing from a platform rodeo manager Gary Williams built her. Serpa died on January 5, 2012, at the age of 86 due to cancer in her home in Tucson, Arizona.

References 

1925 births
2012 deaths
Rodeo photographers
American women photographers
Vassar College alumni
Rodeo in the arts
Chapin School (Manhattan) alumni
21st-century American women
Garrison Forest School people